The municipal elections in Naples took place on 3 and 4 October 2021. The incumbent Mayor of Naples was Luigi de Magistris of Democracy and Autonomy, who won the 2016 Naples municipal election.

Electoral system 
The voting system is used for all mayoral elections in Italy, in the cities with a population higher than 15,000 inhabitants. Under this system, voters express a direct choice for the mayor or an indirect choice voting for the party of the candidate's coalition. If no candidate receives 50% of votes during the first round, the top two candidates go to a second round after two weeks. The winning candidate obtains a majority bonus equal to 60% of seats. During the first round, if no candidate gets more than 50% of votes but a coalition of lists gets the majority of 50% of votes or if the mayor is elected in the first round but its coalition gets less than 40% of the valid votes, the majority bonus cannot be assigned to the coalition of the winning mayor candidate.

The election of the City Council is based on a direct choice for the candidate with a maximum of two preferential votes, each for a different gender, belonging to the same party list: the candidate with the majority of the preferences is elected. The number of the seats for each party is determined proportionally, using D'Hondt seat allocation. Only coalitions with more than 3% of votes are eligible to get any seats.

Background
The center-left coalition will not nominate their candidate through the primary election in order to avoid the same troubles that happened during the last municipal primary election in Naples. Through the municipal secretary of the Democratic Party, the coalition is seeking for an alliance with the Five Star Movement and Italian Left.

Parties and candidates
This is a list of the parties (and their respective leaders) which will participate in the election.

Potential and declined candidates

Potential

Centre-left coalition
 Umberto De Gregorio, President of the Ente Autonomo Volturno
 Gennaro Migliore, Member of the Chamber of Deputies since 2013
 Nicola Oddati, municipal assessor for Naples (2006–2011)

Centre-right coalition
 Gianluigi Cimmino, CEO of Yamamay and Carpisa
 Sergio Rastrelli, lawyer
 Riccardo Monti, manager

Others

Declined

Centre-left coalition
 Vincenzo Amendola, Minister of European Affairs (2019–2021)
 Roberto Fico, President of the Chamber of Deputies since 2018

Centre-right coalition
 Danilo Iervolino, President of UniPegaso

Opinion polls

Candidates

First round

Second round
Manfredi vs. Maresca

Manfredi vs. Bassolino

Manfredi vs. Clemente

Bassolino vs. Maresca

Bassolino vs. Clemente

Clemente vs. Maresca

Parties

Results

See also 
 2021 Italian local elections

References 

Naples
Naples
2021 elections in Italy